Joey Bond, (born March30,1948) is a Romanian-born author, composer, and teacher of Tai Chi. He had a nationally syndicated PBS series which aired on 134 stations, which includes worldwide distribution, from 1994present, entitled Tai Chi Innerwave with Joey Bond, comprising 23programs. Bond teaches Tai Chi Ch’uan and other martial art styles. His students have included golfer Maggie Will and musician Ben Taylor. Bond is, as well, a professional magician.

Over a 20-year-period Bond studied the Yogic Saraswati tradition under the tutelage of teacher Swami Satchidananda. While living in Taipei, Taiwan, from 19731975, he studied Tai Chi, Chi Kung, Tang Lang, and other styles and absorbed Taoist and Buddhist practices. He is the author of the book entitled See Man Jump See God Fall: Tai Chi vs. Technology, released in 1997. He is a graduate of The Magic Castle in Hollywood, California, and performs magic acts which demonstrate Mentalism. Bond's album Steel Dragonfly: Dance of the Tao includes the title track "Jade Pillow" that was used in his PBS series, for which he also composed the music.

Early studies and teaching 

Bond was born into a Roma family in Sibiu, Romania in 1948, and moved to Montreal, Quebec, Canada in 1962. He is a naturalized Canadian citizen, presently lives in Mill Valley, California and has permanent resident status in the United States.

Over a 20-year-period, he studied the Yogic Saraswati tradition, under the tutelage of teacher Swami Satchidananda. From 19731975, he lived in Taipei, Taiwan where he studied Tai Chi, Chi Kung, Tang Lang, and absorbed Taoist and Buddhist practices. Bond then established himself as a Tai Chi teacher in Montreal, teaching Tai Chi and Chi Kung, along with various weaponry including Swordplay, Staff and Iron Fan. Among Bond's notable students are Maggie Will, three times winner on the LPGA Tour, Ben Taylor, son of folk rock artist James Taylor, Margot Lande of the Bronfman family, among others.

Bond teaches the Tai Chi Ch’uan style developed by the Yang family, and which he learned from the Gao family; the latter were disciples of Yang Pin Er. He expanded his studies in the local Wu Shu style, in and around Taiwan, in cities like Tai Chung. He went on to study other Wu Shu styles as well; Tang Lang Northern Mantis, Chen Family/Chi Kung Silk-reeling, Shao Lin Kempo Karate and some unique forms of Chinese Boxing.

Tai Chi Innerwave with Joey Bond (PBS series) 

Bond's PBS series Tai Chi Innerwave demonstrates the Tai Chi Beijing style from Mainland China, filmed at PBS/WEDU television studios. It became Nationally Syndicated  and is arguably the longest running health-care series on the PBS Network from 19942002. It also received international exposure in countries like the Netherlands. Bond demonstrates the Yang family legacy of Martial Arts. The 23 programs comprising the Tai Chi Innerwave series were carried by over 100 PBS stations across the US and Canada from 19942002. The Tampa Tribune took note that "Master Instructor Bond masterfully demonstrates taking control of your body and mind".

In 1997 Janson Media became exclusive copyright distributor of the DVD series, Tai Chi Innerwave with Joey Bond. The DVD is held by the Phoenix Public Library and the Free Library of Philadelphia among many others. Gustavo Sagastume, Vice President of PBS, was the Executive Producer. Joey Bond was the director and writer. The musical soundtrack presented on the PBS Tai Chi Innerwave series is composed by Bond which can be found on his Steel Dragonfly Album.

Wisconsin Bookwatch wrote that the PBS series is; "An excellent introduction to an art useful for exercise, relieving stress and tension, posture improvement, and mental focus". 

The content of the PBS television series intended to bridge a gap between Eastern meditation and Western physical fitness, using Tai Chi's slow, rhythmic movements to create harmony between mind and body. The Tai Chi postures demonstrated included White Crane Spreads Wings, Wave Hands Like Clouds and Part the Wild Horse’s Mane. The program promised viewers of all ages and physical abilities an increase of strength and endurance, improving postural alignment and body tonicity, reducing overall tension and sharpening mental acuity. Bond described the benefits of Tai Chi; "...dynamic exercise approach that delivers both cardiovascular and muscular strength, as well as reinforcing heartfelt creative expression"

Steel Dragonfly Album 

Bond composed the music for his album Steel Dragonfly: Dance of the Tao for use in his PBS series, featuring the title track "Jade Pillow". Other songs on the album include  "Life to Life", "Dream Time", "Out There", "Pearl Asylum", and "Tong Ship Sailing".

Magician and writer

As a professional magician, Bond uses the stage name Jando. Bond entertains audiences with magic performances that demonstrate Mentalism, a performing art in which its practitioners, known as mentalists, appear to demonstrate highly developed mental or intuitive abilities.

He has entertained audiences behind closed doors in the Los Angeles underground scene at Petit Ermitage, The Aqua Lounge in Beverly Hills, as well as the ‘Séance Room’ at the legendary Magic Castle in Hollywood. He has also performed his mentalist act at private events in San Francisco. He has given private presentations for Kevin Bacon at the Sarasota Film Festival in Florida, Bonnie Raitt in Mill Valley, California, Dana Carvey in San Anselmo, California, and the Bronfman family of Canada and other celebrities. Bond has been a member of The Magic Castle since 2004. He fulfilled all requirements set forth by The Academy of Magical Arts, Inc. and earned his diploma, thus receiving all rights and privileges of the Magic Castle.

In 1997, Bond released his book entitled See Man Jump... See God Fall: Tai Chi vs Technology. The book "describes the battle between Tai Chi and Technology and takes you on a journey inward to greater fulfillment."

See also

References

External links
 A Comparative Study of Yang Styles
 Chen Family Tai Chi
 PBSTai Chi Beijing Official 24 Short-Form
 Sri Swami Satchidananda website
 Chi Kung - Master Andrew Dearlove

1948 births
Living people
People from Sibiu
Romanian Romani people
Tai chi practitioners